Nacirema ("American" spelled backwards) is a term used in anthropology and sociology in relation to aspects of the behavior and society of citizens of the United States of America. The neologism attempts to create a deliberate sense of self-distancing in order that American anthropologists might look at their own culture more objectively.

"Body Ritual among the Nacirema"

The original use of the term in a social science context was in "Body Ritual among the Nacirema", which satirizes anthropological papers on "other" cultures, and the culture of the United States. Horace Mitchell Miner wrote the paper and originally published it in the June 1956 edition of American Anthropologist.

In the paper, Miner describes the Nacirema, a little-known tribe living in North America. The way in which he writes about the curious practices that this group performs distances readers from the fact that the North American group described actually corresponds to modern-day Americans of the mid-1950s.

Miner presents the Nacirema as a group living in the territory between the Canadian Cree, the Yaqui and Tarahumare of Mexico, and the Carib and Arawak of the Antilles. The paper describes the typical Western ideal for oral cleanliness, as well as providing an outside view on hospital care and on psychiatry. The Nacirema are described as having a highly developed market economy that has evolved within a rich natural habitat.

Miner's article became a popular work, reprinted in many introductory textbooks and used as an example of process analysis in the literature text The Bedford Reader. The article received the most reprint permission requests of any article in American Anthropologist.

Some of the popular aspects of Nacirema culture include: medicine men and women (doctors, psychiatrists, and pharmacists), a charm-box (medicine cabinet), the mouth-rite ritual (brushing teeth), and a cultural hero known as Notgnihsaw (Washington spelled backwards). These ritual purification practices are prescribed as how humans should comport themselves in the presence of sacred things. These sacred aspects are the rituals that the Nacirema partake in throughout their lives.

"The mysterious fall of the Nacirema"
In 1972 Neil B. Thompson revisited the Nacirema after the fall of their civilization. Thompson's paper, unlike Miner's, primarily offered a social commentary focused on environmental issues. Thompson paid special attention to the Elibomotua (automobile backwards) cult and its efforts to modify the environment.

This article is reprinted and appears as the final chapter in an anthology, Nacirema: Readings on American Culture. The volume contains an array of scholarly investigations into American social anthropology as well as one more article in the Nacirema series, by Willard Walker of Wesleyan University: "The Retention of Folk Linguistic Concepts and the ti'ycir Caste in Contemporary Nacireman Culture" which laments the corrosive and subjugating ritual of attending sguwlz. On phonology, the anthropologist notes:

This refers to the conceptualization of the English vowel system based on orthography (with 5 vowels), which is in stark contrast to the actual system (with nine vowels and several diphthongs).

Nacirema vs. Teamsterville
Gerry Philipsen (1992) studies what he terms "speech codes" among the Nacirema, which he contrasts with the speech codes of another semi-fictionalized group of Americans, the inhabitants of Teamsterville culture. His Nacirema comprises primarily middle-class west-coast Americans.

See also
 Iracema, a character named after the anagram of "America"
Defamiliarization, the artistic technique of presenting common things in an unfamiliar or strange way

References

Additional bibliography

External links 
Body Ritual among the Nacirema (PDF) from American Anthropologist, June 1956
Body Ritual among the Nacirema in  Wikisource format.
The Mysterious Fall of the Nacirema from Natural History, December 1972 (Internet Archive Aug 07, 2004 version)
"Battle RItual among the Nacirema" by Finn Johannson at Ethnography.com (2015)
Who are the Nacirema from Living Anthropologically, (2013, revised 2018)

American culture
Society of the United States
Cultural anthropology
Social anthropology
Ethnographic literature
Humorous hoaxes in science
Satire
1950s neologisms